The Roman Catholic Archdiocese of Anqing 安慶 / Huaining 懷寧 (Wade Giles: Huai-ning / Anking) is an archdiocese located in the city of Anqing in China.

History
 1929.02.21: Established as Apostolic Vicariate of Anqing from the Apostolic Vicariate of Wuhu 蕪湖
 1946.04.11: Promoted as Metropolitan Archdiocese of Anqing

Leadership
 Vicar Apostolic of Anqing 安慶 (Roman Rite)
 Bishop Federico Melendro Gutiérrez, S.J. (February 14, 1930 – April 11, 1946 see below)
 Archbishops of Anqing 安慶 (Roman rite)
 Archbishop Federico Melendro Gutiérrez, S.J. (see above April 11, 1946 – October 25, 1978)
 Bishop Joseph Zhu Hua-yu (1997 - February 26, 2005), listed as not in union with the Holy See
 Bishop Joseph Liu Xinhong (selected 2005; September 22, 2018)

Suffragan dioceses
 Bengbu 蚌埠
 Wuhu 蕪湖

Sources
 GCatholic.org
 Catholic Hierarchy

1929 establishments in China
Anqing
Christianity in Anhui
Christian organizations established in 1929
Anqing
Anqing